Jannat Abad is a large neighbourhood in Tehran, Iran.
It is an area around the Jannat Abad Street located in North West Tehran. Jannat Abad street starts from Ayatollah Kashani Freeway. It has several squares. The most famous one is Chahar Bagh. Jannat Abad Blvd has a South segment that is below the cross with Hemmat Freeway and North part that is located upon Hemmat and links to the Marzdaran Freeway.

Reason for naming Janat Abad 

Janatabad was known by this name in the past because of its heavenly climate.  The rivers Kan, Sulqan, Wardavard, the springs of Bagh Feyz and several aqueducts passed through Janatabad and made this area one of the suburbs of Tehran.  Pomegranate and cherry trees, which are the heritage of gardens of many years, are still visible in the back alleys of this neighborhood.

In the past, there were several rivers in the neighborhood that were used by the residents of the surrounding gardens for water and irrigation.  Due to the abundance of water and the natural irrigation of the gardens, this neighborhood had greenery and a good climate, which is why it was named Jannat. Later it was renamed "Janatabad" meaning the paradise area, which is still  This area due to its distance from the city center and the lack of high traffic and not being in charge of important government organs;  It is a quiet, habitable and calming area with pleasant weather that even in the most polluted days of Tehran, Janatabad has a relatively clean air than other areas.

Most of the lands and gardens of this neighborhood belonged to a famous person named "Nizam Mafi" whose school and mosque are among his relics. He transferred the ownership of these lands to government organizations and the people. At first, this neighborhood was inhabited.  There were workers who worked in factories in the west of Tehran, but with the Islamic Revolution, the growth of construction in this area began in earnest, and the houses in this neighborhood, due to their cheapness, attracted the attention of new immigrants to the capital.  The multi-storey apartments replaced the cherry orchards and dried up the rivers far from the neighborhood, and by 2016, due to the suitability of the houses, many immigrants from all over Tehran and Iran entered the neighborhood, but after  It was controlled by adjusting the population price.

Division of areas and neighborhoods of Jannat Abad 

The neighborhood of  'Janatabad'  is divided into three parts, North, Central and South, due to its size;

North Janatabad is from Simon Bolivar to Hydrologists Highway

Central Janatabad is 
from Abshenasan Highway to Hemmat Highway

South Janatabad is the distance from Hemmat Highway to Ayatollah Kashani.

In addition to its main neighborhood, Janatabad also has 3 other dedicated neighborhoods:

Shaghayegh neighborhood

Neighborhood North shahin

Neighborhood South shahin

Jannatabad Boulevard starts from Simon Bolivar Boulevard and extends to Ayatollah Kashani, which is one of the longest streets in the city of Tehran.

Janatabad from north to south respectively Simon Bolivar Boulevard, Abshenasan Highway, 35 meters of Golestan (Mokhberi), Hemmat Highway, Chaharbagh Square, 35 meters of Laleh Street and at the end  It ends at Ayatollah Kashani

Also, from the west, from the area of Shahid Bakri Highway, the distance Ayatollah Kashani to its end (Simon Bolivar Boulevard) and from the east, from Shahid Sattari Highway and  It ends at Azad University Square.

Important streets 

 Jannat Abad Boulevard
 20 meters of Golestan
 35 meters of Golestan (Shahid Mokhberi)
 North Shahin Boulevard (Kabiri Tameh Boulevard)
 South Shahin Boulevard (Shahid Pajouhandeh Boulevard)
 Mojahed Kabir Street
 Shaghayegh Street (Javanmard)
 Ansar Al-Mahdi Street
 35 meters of Leleh
 Chaharbagh Street

Important public and private bodies 

 District 5 Court of Tehran
 Traffic and driving in District 5 of Tehran
 138 Janatabad Police Station
 The second base of Tehran Intelligence Police
 The second base of Tehran Security Police
 The second base of Tehran Anti-Narcotics Police
 Second Chief of Tehran Police
 Erfan Niayesh specialized and sub-specialized hospital
 Omid specialized and sub-specialized hospital
 Vehicle Technical Inspection Center No. 6
 Noor Cultural Center
 Derafshifar Stadium (Persepolis Tehran)
 Fire Station No. 27
 Main parking lot of Tehran Bus Company
Erfan Niayesh Subspecialty Hospital The most advanced private hospital in Tehran and Iran in Janatabad, which was inaugurated in 2015 by Ishaq Jahangiri, the then Vice President of Iran, which has the most up-to-date equipment and treatment staff and hospital beds, which is unique in Iran.

References

Neighbourhoods in Tehran